The George and Mary Agnes Dana House is located in Fond du Lac, Wisconsin.

History
George Dana was the owner of a furniture company. The house was added to the State Register of Historic Places in 2001 and to the National Register of Historic Places the following year.

References

Houses on the National Register of Historic Places in Wisconsin
National Register of Historic Places in Fond du Lac County, Wisconsin
Houses in Fond du Lac County, Wisconsin
Bungalow architecture in Wisconsin
Brick buildings and structures
Houses completed in 1906
1906 establishments in Wisconsin